The Erie Brewery Company is an American brewery in Erie, Pennsylvania. Founded as a brewpub in 1993, Erie Brewing transitioned to a full-time brewery in 1999. The brewery has won three medals from the Great American Beer Festival.

History 
The Erie Brewing Company was established in January 1994 as brewpub—a combination brewery and restaurant—called Hoppers that was operated out of Union Station in downtown Erie. In 1999, Hoppers became a full microbrewery, took the name Erie Brewing, and moved into the former Pennsylvania Department of Transportation emissions testing building on West 12th Street. It was the first microbrewery to open in northwestern Pennsylvania. Erie Brewing filed for Chapter 11 bankruptcy in September 2005; the company was restructured and emerged from bankruptcy protection in 2006. A group of 21 investors from the private equity firm Cardinal Equity Associates owned the brewery from 2003 until 2012 when it was sold to its current owner Rob Lowther.

In June 2016, Erie Brewing announced it was to build and relocate to a new  facility in Harborcreek Township at Station Road (Pennsylvania Route 290) and Knowledge Parkway near Interstate 90; the company cited excessive, city fees and taxes for the inability to expand their current brewery and having to leave downtown.

Beer 
The Erie Brewing Company currently produces 6 beers year-round, 5 seasonally, and distributes to 13 states. Railbender Ale is Erie Brewing's best seller and most well-known beer; the beer has won two medals—in 2008 and 2009—from the Great American Beer Festival.

Awards

See also 
 List of breweries in Pennsylvania
 List of microbreweries
 List of Great American Beer Festival medalists

References

Sources

External links 
 Erie Brewing Company

1994 establishments in Pennsylvania
Beer brewing companies based in Pennsylvania
Food and drink companies established in 1994
Companies based in Erie, Pennsylvania
Companies that filed for Chapter 11 bankruptcy in 2005
Tourist attractions in Erie, Pennsylvania